NHE or Nhe, an acronym, may refer to:

 Non-human entity or non-human extraterrestrial, see Extraterrestrial Biological Entity

In science
 Normal hydrogen electrode
 sodium-hydrogen exchanger, in molecular biology, a family of biological exchanges
 Non-haemolytic enterotoxin, see Bacillus haemolytic enterotoxin

Other
 Nahuatl Huasteca Eastern (Hidalgo), a Nahuan language form in Mexico. See Huasteca Nahuatl
 New Home Economics, a household approach to the study of economics
 The station code for the New Hythe railway station in the United Kingdom
 The code letters of the World War I naval destroyer vessel USS Hull (DD-7)
 New Hydrogen Energy, a 1992-1997 program in Japan researching cold fusion